Agasicles is a genus of flea beetles belonging to the family Chrysomelidae. The species of this genus are native to South America, though the species Agasicles hygrophila has been introduced to the southeastern United States as a biological control agent against alligator weed.

Species
The genus includes five species:
 Agasicles connexa 
 Agasicles hygrophila 
 Agasicles interrogationis 
 Agasicles opaca 
 Agasicles vittata

References

Alticini
Chrysomelidae genera
Taxa named by Martin Jacoby
Beetles of South America